Leptodeira pulchriceps is a species of snake in the family Colubridae.  The species is native to Argentina, Bolivia, Brazil, and Paraguay.

References

Leptodeira
Snakes of South America
Reptiles of Argentina
Reptiles of Bolivia
Reptiles of Brazil
Reptiles of Paraguay
Reptiles described in 1958